Unladylike is an East St. Louis hip hop duo composed of Teosha "Tee" Thomas and Jasmine "Gunna" Baker, which records for Def Jam Recordings. The duo released its debut album, Certified, on June 2, 2009.

Discography

American hip hop groups
Def Jam Recordings artists